Nature Medicine is a monthly peer-reviewed medical journal published by Nature Portfolio covering all aspects of medicine. It was established in 1995. The journal seeks to publish research papers that "demonstrate novel insight into disease processes, with direct evidence of the physiological relevance of the results". As with other Nature journals, there is no external editorial board, with editorial decisions being made by an in-house team, although peer review by external expert referees forms a part of the review process. The editor-in-chief is João Monteiro.

According to the Journal Citation Reports, the journal has a 2021 impact factor of 87.241, ranking it 1st out of 296 journals in the category "Biochemistry & Molecular Biology".

References

External links 
 

Publications established in 1995
Nature Research academic journals
General medical journals
Monthly journals
English-language journals